Leonid Kamburov is a Russian professional vert skater. Kamburov started skating when he was 14 in 1996 and turned professional in 2002. Kamburov has attended many competitions in his vert skating career.

Best Tricks McTwist 1080, Fakie 900

Vert Competitions 
2012 Asian X-Games in China 4th place
2011 Asian X-Games in China 7th place
2010 European Championships 3rd place
2009 European Championships 4th place

References

External links
rollernews.com
kiaxgamesasia.com
toxboe.net
redbull.com
xsk8.de

1982 births
Living people
Vert skaters
X Games athletes